Maratha was a village of ancient Arcadia, in the district Cynuria, between Buphagium and Gortys. Its site is unlocated, although the modern village of Vlachorraptis has been suggested.

References

Populated places in ancient Arcadia
Former populated places in Greece
Lost ancient cities and towns